New Castle School of Trades (NCST) is a private for-profit technical school in New Castle, Pennsylvania and East Liverpool, Ohio. It is accredited by the Accrediting Commission of Career Schools and Colleges of Technology.

History
The New Castle School of Trades was founded in 1945 to train its students in skilled trades.

In 1973, NCST earned accreditation from the Accrediting Commission of the National Association of Trade and Technical Schools. Nine years later, in 1982, NCST was approved to award the associate degrees in Specialized Technology by the Pennsylvania Department of Education.

In 2011, NCST acquired a second location in New Castle, Pennsylvania. The previous location is still in use.

External links
 Official website

Education in Pennsylvania
Educational institutions established in 1945
Education in Lawrence County, Pennsylvania
New Castle, Pennsylvania
1945 establishments in Pennsylvania